Clubhouse is an album by American jazz saxophonist Dexter Gordon. It was recorded in 1965, but not released until 1979 by Blue Note Records.

Critical reception

Robert Christgau of The Village Voice called Clubhouse "superb" and "mature late bebop". Allmusic's Scott Yanow gave the album three out of five stars and stated, "It is excellent music if not quite essential".

Track listing
All compositions by Dexter Gordon, except where noted.

 "Hanky Panky" – 6:32
 "I'm a Fool to Want You" (Joel Herron, Frank Sinatra, Jack Wolf) – 6:43
 "Devilette" (Ben Tucker) – 7:05
 "Clubhouse" – 7:33
 "Lady Iris B." (Rudy Stevenson) – 5:41
 "Jodi" – 5:40

Source:

Personnel
Dexter Gordon – tenor saxophone
Freddie Hubbard – trumpet (tracks 1–5)
Barry Harris – piano
Bob Cranshaw – bass (tracks 1, 2, 4–6)
Ben Tucker – bass (track 3)
Billy Higgins – drums

Source:

References

External links 
 

Blue Note Records albums
Dexter Gordon albums
1979 albums
Albums recorded at Van Gelder Studio
Albums produced by Alfred Lion